Asbjørn Øverås (4 April 1896, in Nesset, Møre og Romsdal – 13 October 1966) was a Norwegian educator.

Born in Nesset, he worked as a headmaster in Orkdal from 1923. Having taken the dr.philos. degree in 1937, he worked as principal of Trondheim Cathedral School from 1938 to 1966. Influenced by Grundtvig as an educator, he edited the journal Norsk pedagogisk tidsskrift from 1941 to 1945. He was the chairman of Noregs Mållag from 1949 to 1952.

References

1896 births
1966 deaths
People from Nesset
Noregs Mållag leaders
Norwegian educators